The Dancing Count Stakes is an American Thoroughbred horse race held in January at Laurel Park Racecourse in Laurel, Maryland. It is open to three-year-olds and is run at six furlongs on dirt.

An ungraded stakes, it offers a purse of $100,000. The Dancing Count is also one of Maryland's Triple Crown prep races. The winner of this race typically moves on to compete in the Private Terms Stakes held in March at Laurel Park Racecourse as well, but winners have also ventured off to New York and Kentucky for their next races.

The race was named in honor of one of Maryland's top stallions, Northern Dancer's son Dancing Count, who sired more than 20 graded stakes winners. His progeny include three-time Maryland Million Ladies winner Countus In. Another daughter Count On Bonnie, was the dam of Wclipse champion Hansel, who won the 1991 Preakness Stakes and Belmont Stakes. Dancing Count stood his final years at Shamrock Farm and died in April 1994 at age 26.

Records 

Speed record: 
 6 furlongs - 1:09.79 - Russell Road (2009) 
 7 furlongs - 1:23.20 - Can't Be Denied (1994)

Most wins by an owner:
 no owner has the Dancing Count Stakes more than once

Most wins by a jockey:
 4 - Edgar Prado    (1991, 1993, 1998 & 1999)

Most wins by a trainer:
 2 - Gary Capuano    (2006 & 2011)
 2 - Dale Capuano    (1998 & 2002)
 2 - Carlos A. Garcia    (1993 & 1994)

Winners of the Dancing Count Stakes since 1985 

* On January 30, 2010 Racing Secretary Georganne Hale reported that the entire Saturday card at Laurel Park would be canceled due to 6.5" of snow and ice. Later that afternoon she reported that the running of the Dancing Count Stakes had been cancelled for this year and would not be carded anytime in 2010.

See also 
 Dancing Count Stakes top three finishers
 Laurel Park Racecourse

References

External links
 Laurel Park website

1985 establishments in Maryland
Triple Crown Prep Races
Laurel Park Racecourse
Horse races in Maryland
Recurring sporting events established in 1985